Martina Blos (born 17 June 1957) is a German former sprinter. She competed in the women's 100 metres at the 1976 Summer Olympics representing East Germany.

References

External links
 

1957 births
Living people
People from East Berlin
Athletes from Berlin
German female sprinters
Olympic athletes of East Germany
Athletes (track and field) at the 1976 Summer Olympics
20th-century German women
Olympic female sprinters